The team event competition at the 2013 European Diving Championships was held on 18 June with a preliminary round and the final.

Results
The final was held at 17:30.

References

2013 European Diving Championships